Skilton may refer to:

Avery Judd Skilton (1802–1858), American physician and naturalist 
Bob Skilton (born 1938), Australian rules football player who played as a rover for South Melbourne and Victoria
Charles Sanford Skilton (1868–1941), American composer, teacher and musicologist
Chris Skilton (born 1955), Archdeacon of Lambeth
Edward Skilton (1863–1917), British sport shooter who competed in the 1912 Summer Olympics
Emmett Skilton (born 1987), New Zealand based actor
Raymie Skilton (1889–1961), American professional ice hockey defenseman

See also
Bob Skilton Medal, awarded to the Sydney Swans player adjudged the Best and Fairest over the home and away season
Skilton Ledge, relatively flat rectangular rock platform at the southeast margin of Midnight Plateau, Darwin Mountains